Ibrahim Diakité (born 31 October 2003) is a professional footballer who plays as a defender for Belgian club Eupen on loan from the French club Reims. Born in France, he plays for the Guinea national team.

Early life
Diakité was born in France to Guinean parents. They were from Touba, Boké Region.

Professional career
Diakité is a youth product of Reims, and debuted with their reserves in 2020. He was promoted to their senior team in 2021. He made his professional debut with Reims in a 1–1 Ligue 1 tie with Marseille on 22 December 2021.

On 13 January 2023, Diakité was loaned by Eupen in Belgium for the rest of the 2022–23 season.

International career
Born in France, Diakité is of Guinean descent. He was called up to the senior Guinea national team for a set of friendlies in September 2022. He made his debut with Guinea in a 3–1 friendly loss to Ivory Coast on 27 September 2022.

References

External links
 

2003 births
Living people
Guinean footballers
Guinea international footballers
French footballers
Association football defenders
French people of Guinean descent
Stade de Reims players
K.A.S. Eupen players
Ligue 1 players
Championnat National 2 players
Belgian Pro League players
Guinean expatriate footballers
Expatriate footballers in Belgium
Guinean expatriate sportspeople in Belgium